Faller-Klamm-Brücke is a road bridge near Fall in the Lenggries municipality in Landkreis Bad Tölz-Wolfratshausen, Upper Bavaria, Germany. The bridge bears Bundesstraße 307 and spans Lake Sylvenstein (with a water surface of 752.0 MASL) and has one lane per direction.

It has a length of 329 meters and was built in 1957.

Literature
Moll, Udo (1983), Brücken in Deutschland. HB Verlagsgesellschaft, Hamburg (Germany), pp. 8–9.

External links

Footnotes

Buildings and structures in Bad Tölz-Wolfratshausen
Road bridges in Germany
Bridges completed in 1957
Concrete bridges
Transport in Bavaria